The Pool Malebo, formerly Stanley Pool, also known as Mpumbu, Lake Nkunda or Lake Nkuna by local indigenous people in pre-colonial times, is a lake-like widening in the lower reaches of the Congo River.  The river serves as the border between the Republic of the Congo on the north and the Democratic Republic of the Congo to the south.

The pool's former name was in honour of the British explorer and journalist Sir Henry Morton Stanley, who mapped this area.

History
In the late 19th century, British colonists named this natural feature Stanley Pool, after British explorer and journalist Henry Morton Stanley, who had mapped and reported on this region. When a railway was constructed nearby, a plaque was installed at Palaba to commemorate the rail line connecting Matadi to Stanley Pool.

Description

Its central part is occupied by M'Bamou or Bamu Island, which is Republic of the Congo territory.

The pool is shallow with depths of 3–10 m. But water levels may vary by as much as 3 m over the course of a year, because of seasonal flooding.

Geography
The capitals of the Republic of the Congo and the Democratic Republic of the Congo —Brazzaville and Kinshasa, respectively— are located on opposite shores of the southern part of Pool Malebo. These two capital cities are the closest geographically of any in the world (other than the contiguous Rome, Italy and Vatican City).

The Pool is the beginning of the navigable part of the Congo River upstream to the cities of Mbandaka, Kisangani and Bangui. Downstream, navigation of the river is blocked by its descent through hundreds of meters in a series of rapids known as the Livingstone Falls. The river reaches sea level at the port of Boma, Congo, after a passage of 300 km.

Ecology

Flora
There are many palm and papyrus swamps along the edges of the river and pool. Floating mats of Eichhornia plants move on the river and drift through the pool.

Fish
Most fish endemic to the area are catfishes, including the mountain catfish, L. brieni, Leptoglanis mandevillei, L. bouilloni and Atopochilus chabanaudi, an upside-down catfish. More than 200 fish species have been documented. Mormyrids are the most common, with over 40 species, and have the highest diversification.

See also
Pombeiros

References

Congo River
Malebo
Malebo
Malebo
Malebo
Malebo
Freshwater ecoregions of Africa